There have been black managers in English football since 1960 when Tony Collins was appointed by Rochdale. Though Collins was manager from 1960 to 1967 and reached the 1962 Football League Cup Final, he was overlooked for many years and Keith Alexander at Lincoln City in 1993 was believed to be the first black manager in the country.

An article in The Independent in 2018 found that a quarter of retired England internationals since 1990 had been black, though only one seventh of those had gone into management. Of those five individuals, one was still working in 2018 and only one had managed in the Premier League, for under a year.

History

Background and players
Pioneering black players in early English football history include Gold Coast (Ghana)-born Arthur Wharton who was the first black professional in the 1880s, and former Tottenham Hotspur player Walter Tull who was killed in World War I where he was the first black commander in the British Army to command white troops. Plymouth Argyle forward Jack Leslie was due to become the first black international for England in 1925 but was suddenly dropped, ostensibly because selectors discovered his skin colour.

Modern immigration to the United Kingdom increased the amount of black people in the country and in football. In 1978, Viv Anderson was the first black man to be capped by the senior England team, and in 1993 Paul Ince was its first black captain.

Managerial history
In 1960, Tony Collins was appointed by Rochdale. He was the first black manager in English history, and took the Football League Fourth Division team to the 1962 Football League Cup Final, where they lost 4–0 on aggregate to Norwich City. After leaving in 1967, he remained in the game as a scout for Leeds United and Manchester United.

Keith Alexander was appointed by Lincoln City in 1993. He died in 2010 while managing Macclesfield Town, and was mistakenly reported at the time to have been English football's first black manager. Dutchman Ruud Gullit was the first top-flight black manager with Chelsea in 1995, and the first to win the FA Cup in 1997.

In June 2008, Paul Ince became the first black English manager in the Premier League, taking over at Blackburn Rovers after his spell at Milton Keynes Dons. He was sacked in December. As of November 2021, ten black people had managed in the Premier League, two of whom only as caretaker managers.

References

Football in England
Black British history